Povilas Lukšys (born 7 July 1979) is a Lithuanian footballer who plays for the Lithuanian I Lyga club Utenis Utena as a striker. 

He signed for FK Ekranas during the 1995–96 season. In 2005, Lukšys helped FK Ekranas to win the A Lyga. Throughout the season he scored 19 goals and was the 3rd top scorer in the league. In 2006, Ekranas finished second, placing behind champions FBK Kaunas. During the 2006 season, Lukšys scored 13 goals was the 6th top scorer. In July 2013 Lukšys joined the Latvian Higher League club Daugava Rīga. With 12 goals in 14 league matches he became the club's top scorer and helped Daugava Rīga reach its best success in the history of the club finishing the league in the top four. In March 2014 Lukšys moved to the Polish I liga club Wigry Suwałki. 

Lukšys has made four appearances for the Lithuania national football team.

References

External links

1979 births
Living people
Lithuanian footballers
Lithuania international footballers
Association football forwards
FK Ekranas players
FK Sūduva Marijampolė players
Polonia Bytom players
Wigry Suwałki players
Lithuanian expatriate sportspeople in Poland
Expatriate footballers in Poland
FK Daugava (2003) players
Expatriate footballers in Latvia
Lithuanian expatriate sportspeople in Latvia